Lopamudra Mitra is an Indian Bengali-language singer.

Early life 
Mitra was born in Kolkata, India. She was born in a middle class family. Mitra studied from Basanti Devi College, Kolkata a University of Calcutta affiliated college.

Discography
Modern songs Albums
 Annya Hawa (1996)
 Annya Hawar Annya Gaan (1999)
 Sankota Dulcchey (1999)
 Bhalobashtey Bolo (2000)
 Dakchey Akash (2001)
 Kobita Theke Gaan (2002)
 Ei Abelay (2003)
 E Ghar Tokhon (2003)
 Pran Khola Gaan (2003)
 Jhor Hote Pari (2004)
 Ek Tukro Road (2005)
 Emono Hoy (2006)
 Chhata Dhoro (2007)
 Po e Pora Fo e Fail (2008)
 Gaalfuluni Khukumoni (2009)
 Monfokira (2011)
 Vande Mataram (2014)

Tagore songs
 Bisshmoye (Tagore songs)(2004)
 Kotha Seshe (Tagore songs)
 O mor Dorodiya (Tagore songs)
 Mone Rekho (Tagore songs, 2006)
 Ananda - The Ecstasy (Music arrangement by Joy Sarkar and Durbadal Chatterjee, 2009)
 Khoma Koro Prabhu (2015)

Basic albums (Collaborative)
 Notun Ganer Nouka Bawa (1997) (with Kabir Suman)
 Bhitor Ghorey Bristi (1998) (with Kabir Suman)
 Ganbela (2004) (with Srikanto Acharya)
 Surer Doshor (with Srikanto Acharya)
 Shapmochan (Tagore dance drama – with Srikanto Acharya and others)

Mixed
 Choto Boro Miley (1996) (Suman, Nachiketa, Anjan, Lopamudra and Indrani Sen)

Awards
She won many awards for her unique dramatic style of singing, which is fashioned with the classical aid and tenor voice quality.
 Gold Disc Award by HMV in Completion of 10th year of her music life.
 Bengal Film Journalists' Association - Best Female Playback Award for Sedin Chaitramash.
 Best Singer & Best Album of the year, 2001, from Anandabazar Patrika for Bhalobaste Balo.
 Best Singer, Star Jalsa Award, 2011.

References

External links
 Mone Rekho by Lopamudra Mitra
 Bengali Beat
 Rendition holds audience spellbound

Living people
Bengali singers
Indian women folk singers
Indian folk singers
Singers from Kolkata
University of Calcutta alumni
Rabindra Sangeet exponents
Year of birth missing (living people)
20th-century Indian women singers
20th-century Indian singers
21st-century Indian singers
21st-century Indian women singers
Women musicians from West Bengal
20th-century women composers
19th-century women composers